Derek Lance Rackley (born July 18, 1977) is a former American football long snapper and tight end who played 8 seasons in the National Football League (NFL). Rackley is currently a football analyst and broadcaster for the Comcast/Charter Sports Southeast nightly television show, SportsNite, as well as a game and studio analyst for the Big Ten Network (BTN) and Westwood One. Rackley also regularly appears on The Big Ten Pulse also on BTN.
Derek Rackley worked as an Analyst for select Sunday night Football games on Westward One in 2021.

High school years
Rackley was born in Apple Valley, Minnesota and attended Apple Valley High School in Apple Valley. As a senior, he was an All-State Honorable Mention honoree and an Academic All-State honoree. He graduated in 1995 from Apple Valley High School with honors.

College career
Rackley attended the University of Minnesota and was a four-year letterman in football. He saw action as tight end, in addition to handling long snapper duties for four years. He worked for  General Mills in Minnesota before he began his professional career.

Professional career
Rackley caught the only touchdown of his career on December 30, 2001 when the Falcons were playing at the Miami Dolphins.

References

External links
Pro-Football-Reference.Com
Big Ten Network

1977 births
American football tight ends
American football long snappers
Atlanta Falcons players
College football announcers
National Football League announcers
Living people
Minnesota Golden Gophers football players
Seattle Seahawks players
People from Apple Valley, Minnesota
Players of American football from Minnesota
Apple Valley High School (Minnesota) alumni